Martha Mariana Castro (born November 7, 1966) is a Mexican actress. She was married to actor Fernando Luján, with whom she has a son, Franco Paolo Ciangherotti.

Early life 
Born in Cuautla, Morelos, she grew up in the city of Puebla and earned a degree in Philosophy and Literature from the Universidad de Puebla.

She began her acting career as a child in plays. , she is the protagonist of Los Sánchez, a telenovela on TV Azteca based on the Argentine production Los Roldán. In this production she plays the role of Yoli, a woman in love with her widower brother-in-law.

Films
 Espinas (2005) as Rebeca
 Smee (short, 2004)

Telenovelas
 Mujer comprada (2009) as Ofelia
 Vuélveme A Querer (2009) as Irene Robles
 Campeones de la vida (2007) as Alma
 Los Sánchez (2004) as Yolanda "Yoli" de Sánchez
 Mirada de mujer: El regreso (2003) as Daniela
 Tres veces Sofía (1998) as Laura de Márquez
 Mirada de mujer (1997) as Daniela
 La sonrisa del diablo (1996)
 El vuelo del águila (1996) as Justa Saavedra (Rafaela)
 La paloma (1995)
 Valentina (1993) as Mariela

TV shows
 Y sin embargo... se mueve (1994)

External links
 
Los Sanchez at the Telenovela database

1966 births
Living people
People from Cuautla
People from Puebla (city)
Mexican film actresses
Mexican telenovela actresses
Universidad de Puebla alumni
20th-century Mexican actresses
21st-century Mexican actresses